Paul Louis Ryan (1943–2013) was an American video artist and communications theorist. His video art encompassed water studies and demonstrations of what Ryan called “a yoga of relationships” or Threeing, culminating in his theoretical development of the Peircean relational circuit and Earthscore notational system.

Biography
Ryan was born in 1943 in The Bronx, New York and was raised in northern New Jersey. In 1960, he joined the Passionists, a monastic preaching order of the Catholic Church; in 1962, he earned an A.A. degree from the Passionists Monastic Seminary System. After pursuing an additional three years of independent philosophical and theological studies with the order, Ryan returned to secular life in 1965. He enrolled at New York University on a full tuition scholarship, where he studied under H.W. Janson and Walter Ong before receiving a B.A. in English in 1967.

Work
He partially fulfilled his alternate service requirement as a conscientious objector during the Vietnam War by assisting Marshall McLuhan as a "McLuhan Fellow" during the media theorist's 1967-1968 term as Albert Schweitzer Professor of the Humanities at Fordham University. He completed his service requirement at Fordham during the 1968-1969 term, "exploring video as a medium in McLuhan‟s terms" with early Portapak cameras. He considered this combination of "theory and practice" to be equivalent to a Master of Fine Arts degree. In 1969, he exhibited in the seminal TV as a Creative Medium show (widely regarded as one of the birth pangs of video art) at the Howard Wise Gallery and cofounded the Raindance Foundation with Frank Gillette, Michael Shamberg and Ira Schneider. While McLuhan depicted World War III in 1970 as a "guerrilla information war," in the same year Ryan wrote "Cybernetic Guerrilla Warfare" for Raindance's Radical Software journal, anticipating the subsequent development of guerrilla television in 1971.

Shortly thereafter, Ryan founded Earthscore, an intentional community in New York's Hudson Valley inspired by Gregory Bateson's writings on cybernetic feedback and the triadic thought of Charles Sanders Peirce; this precipitated the development of the Earthscore semiotic system as initially delineated in the peremptory section of Cybernetics of the Sacred, a collection of essays published in 1974. The resultant "Threeing"—a video demonstrating "a ‘yoga’ of relationships... in which three people take turns playing three different roles; initiator, respondent and mediator"—premiered at The Kitchen in 1976. This led to Ryan's conceptual development of the relational circuit, "an original topological figure that synthesizes cybernetics and semiotics" with applications in such disparate fields as international relations and conflict resolution.

As an artist, Ryan exhibited and performed at The Kitchen, the Rose Art Museum, the Museum of Modern Art, The Cloisters, the Venice Biennial, and the Dancing Theatre in New Paltz, New York. He taught at New York University, the State University of New York at New Paltz, the Savannah College of Art and Design, and The New School, where he was an associate professor of media studies at the time of his death.

On December 18, 1995, Ryan appeared on former New Paltz faculty colleague  Harold Channer's talk show Conversations with Harold Hudson Channer, on MNN.

In 2008, the Smithsonian Institution's Archives of American Art created the collection Paul Ryan papers, 1943-2008.

A longtime resident of the Upper West Side in New York City, Ryan died on December 17, 2013 at his second home in Solebury, Pennsylvania following a long illness.

Notable Books
The Three Person Solution, Purdue University Press, 2009
Cybernetics of the Sacred, Doubleday Anchor, 1974

Notes

References
Greenwald, Dara (2007) The Process is in the Streets: Challenging Media America in MacPhee, Josh and Reuland, Erik (2007) Realizing the impossible: art against authority
Greenwald, Dara (2007) The Grassroots Video Pioneers in The Brooklyn Rail, May 2007
Marshall McLuhan (1970) Culture is our business
Ryan, Paul (1970) Cybernetic guerrilla warfare in Radical Software, Volume 1, Issue 3, 1971
Shamberg, Michael, Raindance Corporation (1971) Guerrilla television Chapter "process notes"
Strangelove, Michael (2005) The empire of mind: digital piracy and the anti-capitalist movement

External links

 at Conversations with harold Hudson Channer (video)
(video)
Earthscore, a notational system developed by Paul Ryan

1943 births
American video artists
2013 deaths